The Coupe de France's results of the 1963–64 season. Olympique Lyonnais won the final played on May 10, 1964, beating Girondins de Bordeaux.

Round of 64

Round of 32

Round of 16

Quarter-finals

Semi-finals

Final

External links 
 Coupe de france 1963–64 at fff.fr 

France
Cup
Coupe de France seasons